Dark Blue Kiss (Dark Blue Kiss – ;  Dark Blue Kiss - The Last Kiss Is For You Only) is a 2019 Thai television series starring Tawan Vihokratana (Tay), Thitipoom Techaapaikhun (New), Suphakorn Sriphothong (Pod), Gawin Caskey (Fluke) and Chayapol Jutamas (AJ).

Directed by Aof Noppharnach and produced by GMMTV, the series was one of the thirteen television series for 2019 launched by GMMTV in their "Wonder Th13teen" event on 5 November 2018. It premiered on GMM 25 and LINE TV on 12 October 2019, airing on Saturdays at 21:25 ICT and 23:00 ICT, respectively. The series concluded on 28 December 2019.

Synopsis 
Taking off from the Kiss Me Again series, Pete (Tawan Vihokratana) and Kao (Thitipoom Techaapaikhun), who is still closeted from his mother, have grown closer to each other in their relationship. As his sister goes to college, Kao contributes to his family's finances by taking on part-time tutoring for high school students. The director of the school where his mom works asks Kao to tutor his son, Non (Chayapol Jutamas), after hearing that he is a good tutor. Pete crosses paths with Non in a competition and pisses him off after learning that Kao is tutoring him. With Non fueling Pete's jealousy, his relationship with Kao gets tested in several occasions.

Sun (Supakorn Sriphotong), who was pursuing Kao before, has been nagging Mork (Gawin Caskey) for dragging his younger brother, Rain (Pluem Pongpisal), into his troubles. To help Mork change his life, Sun offers Mork a job in his café. Along the way, the two of them start to care for each other. However, with Mork's dangerous life still troubling him, Sun makes it clear that he is there because he cares for him.

Cast and characters 
Below are the cast of the series:

Main 
 Tawan Vihokratana (Tay) as Pete 
 Thitipoom Techaapaikhun (New) as Kao
 Suphakorn Sriphothong (Pod) as Sun
 Gawin Caskey (Fluke) as Mork
 Chayapol Jutamat (AJ) as Non

Supporting 
 Pluem Pongpisal as Rain
 Lapassalan Jiravechsoontornkul (Mild) as Sandee
 Jirakit Thawornwong (Mek) as Thada
 Nachat Juntapun (Nicky) as June
 Patchatorn Thanawat (Ploy) as Manow
 Lapisara Intarasut (Apple) as Kitty
 Krittaphat Chanthanaphot as Pete's father
 Benja Singkharawat (Yangyi) as Kao's mother
 Paramej Noiam as Non's father

Guest role 
 Thanaboon Wanlopsirinun (Na) as barista
 Phuwin Tangsakyuen
 Trai Nimtawat (Neo)

Soundtracks

Reception 
On 24 December 2019, GMMTV announced a fan meeting event dubbed as "POLCA The Journey: Tay & New 1st Fan Meeting in Thailand" scheduled for 21 March 2020 at Chaengwattana Hall, CentralPlaza Chaengwattana featuring the series' main casts. However, due to COVID-19 pandemic concerns, the said event was postponed and was rescheduled twice to 1 August 2020 and later to 28 November 2020. A month prior to the new date of the fan meeting event, GMMTV announced on 21 October 2020 that it will now be scheduled for 20 February 2021 and will be made available to fans outside of Thailand via V Live on the same date. The venue has also been moved to the Union Hall of Union Mall.

Thailand television ratings 
In the table below,  represents the lowest rating and  represent the highest ratings.

 Based on the average audience share per episode.

Awards and nominations

International broadcast 
Japan – The series will premiere on 12 October 2020 at 23:00 JST on SKY PerfecTV!. Succeeding episodes will be released every Mondays thereafter. For , only the first episode will be aired for free.
Philippines – The series was among the five GMMTV television series acquired by ABS-CBN Corporation, as announced by Dreamscape Entertainment on 10 September 2020. All episodes were made available for streaming via iWantTFC on 26 October 2020.

References

External links 
 Dark Blue Kiss on GMM 25 website 
 Dark Blue Kiss  on LINE TV
 
 GMMTV

Television series by GMMTV
Thai boys' love television series
Thai romantic comedy television series
2019 Thai television series debuts
2019 Thai television series endings
GMM 25 original programming
2010s LGBT-related comedy television series